Power curve may refer to:

The power band of an internal combustion engine, the range of speeds in which it operates efficiently
The power curve in aerodynamics, a characteristic curve of drag vs. airspeed for airfoils
A power law graph in statistics
 Curves used for crossfading between multiple audio signals, used in audio mixing and digital signal processing
The relationship between statistical power and effect size (or sometimes, between statistical power and sample size).

de:Leistungskurve